Ivan Josović (born 27 December 1989) is a Serbian football defender who plays for Kokand 1912.

References

External links
 
 Ivan Josović stats at utakmica.rs
 Ivan Josović stats at footballdatabase.eu

1989 births
Living people
People from Ivanjica
Association football defenders
Serbian footballers
Serbian expatriate footballers
FK Javor Ivanjica players
FK Sloga Požega players
FK Radnički 1923 players
FK Borac Čačak players
FK Inđija players
Uzbekistan Super League players
Serbian First League players
Serbian SuperLiga players
Serbian expatriate sportspeople in Uzbekistan
Expatriate footballers in Uzbekistan